Pierre Kakhia is president of the Lebanese Basketball Federation, and a member of the Lebanese Olympic Committee.

Career 
He works in the world of Lebanese and Middle East sports (Basketball but also Football). He is president of West Asia at World Sport Group.

In 2001, Kakhia established the West Asian Football Federation (WAFF) which was located in Jordan and headed by Prince Ali bin Hussein.

Kakhia has business ties to Sheikh Salman Bin Ibrahim Al-Khalifa, president of the Asian Football Confederation.

References 

Basketball in Lebanon
Lebanese sportspeople
Living people
Year of birth missing (living people)
Place of birth missing (living people)